The following is a list of Halley-type comets (HTCs), which are periodic comets with an orbital period between 20 and 200 years, often appearing only once or twice within one's lifetime. The majority come from between the orbits of Saturn and Neptune. Due to the nature of their orbits, they can be perturbed by the giant planets and sent into orbits too far from the Sun to outgas, and vice versa. Minor planets in comet-like orbits similar to HTCs that never come close enough to the Sun to outgas are called centaurs. HTCs are named after the first discovered member, and the first discovered periodic comet, Halley's Comet, which orbits the Sun in about 75 years, and passing as far as the orbit of Neptune.

Most of the comets that have a period between 20 and 200 years (making them HTCs based on the classical definition) are actually officially classified as either Jupiter-family comets (JFCs) or Chiron-type comets (CTCs), based on their Jupiter Tisserand's parameter (TJupiter). Although JFCs are classically defined by (P < 20 y), they're officially defined by (2 < TJupiter < 3). CTCs, on the other hand, are officially defined by (TJupiter > 3; a > aJupiter). Since they do not include any period-related constraints, some of the 20–200 year-period comets unfortunately match one of the classifications, making comet classifications even more vague.

Numbered HTCs 

For the 14 numbered HTCs, see the list of numbered comets, where they are labelled "HTC" in column "class".

Unnumbered HTCs 

This list contains only Halley-type comets which are not numbered yet because they have been observed only once. Comets that belong to a different comet classification based on its Jupiter Tisserand parameter are given its alternative classification next to the comets' name.

See also
 List of comets by type
 List of near-parabolic comets
 List of hyperbolic comets

References

 
Halley-type comets